Ethylene diurea (EDU) is an organic compound with the formula (CH2NHCONH2)2.  It is a white solid.  

The compound has attracted interest as a potential antiozonant for crop protection. With respect to preventing the harmful effects on crops by ozone, EDU appears to either prevent the harmful effects of ozone or it stimulated plant growth. Trees treated with EDU were significantly healthier in both leaf longevity and water use efficiency.

The effectiveness of EDU depends upon several environmental factors.

References

Ureas